Hershey Ridge is a low, ice-covered ridge trending in a northwest–southeast direction for about  between McKinley Peak and the Haines Mountains, in the Ford Ranges of Marie Byrd Land, Antarctica. It was discovered in 1934 by the Byrd Antarctic Expedition, and named for Garland Hershey, Assistant State Geologist of the Iowa Geological Survey (1939–47) and Director of the Iowa Geological Survey after 1947.

References

Ridges of Marie Byrd Land